"A Memory of Two Mondays" is a television play directed by Paul Bogart in 1971, based on the play by Arthur Miller. It aired on the PBS series NET Playhouse.

Premise
A group of workers earn their livings in a Brooklyn automobile parts warehouse during the Great Depression. Most are filled with hopelessness, some are alcoholics. Kenneth (Dan Hamilton), however, is a young man yearning for a college education.

Cast
 Donald Buka as Mr. Eagle
 Catherine Burns as Patricia
 J.D. Cannon as Tom
 George Grizzard as Larry
 Dan Hamilton as Kenneth
 Earl Hindman as William
 Barnard Hughes as Jim
 Harvey Keitel as Jerry
 Tony Lo Bianco as Frank
 Estelle Parsons as Agnes
 Tom Rosqui as Unemployed Man
 Jerry Stiller as The Mechanic
 Kristoffer Tabori as Bert
 Dick Van Patten as Raymond
 Jack Warden as Gus

References

External links
 

Television episodes set during the Great Depression
1971 American television episodes
1971 television plays
NET Playhouse